Greg Ball may refer to:
Greg Ball (politician) (born 1977), New York state senator
Greg Ball (cyclist) (born 1974), Australian Paralympic cyclist
Gregory F. Ball, American psychologist

See also
Ball (surname)